Chak Kanthalia is a census town in Barrackpore II CD Block in Barrackpore subdivision of North 24 Parganas district in the state of West Bengal, India.

Geography

Location
Chak Kanthalia, Ruiya, Patulia and Bandipur form a cluster of census towns around Titagarh/ Khardaha. Karna Madhabpur, with the CD Block headquarters, is also located nearby.

96% of the population of Barrackpore subdivision (partly presented in the map alongside, all places marked on the map are linked in the full screen map) lives in urban areas. In 2011, it had a density of population of 10,967 per km2. The subdivision has 16 municipalities and 24 census towns.

For most of the cities/ towns information regarding density of population is available in the Infobox. Population data is not available for neighbourhoods. It is available for the entire Municipal area and thereafter ward-wise.

Police station
Khardaha police station under Barrackpore Police Commissionerate has jurisdiction over Khardaha Municipal area and Barrackpore II CD Block.

Demographics
As per the 2011 Census of India, Chak Kanthalia had a total population of 11,108, of which 5,704 (51%) were males and 5,404 (49%) were females. Population below 6 years was 1,023. The total number of literates in Chak Kanthalia was 8,722 (86.48% of the population over 6 years).

Infrastructure
As per the District Census Handbook 2011, Chak Kanthalia covered an area of 0.7108 km2. Amongst the medical facilities it had were 7 medicine shops. Amongst the medical facilities it had were 1 primary school and 1 middle school. The nearest secondary and senior secondary schools were available 3 km away at Senri.

Transport
Kalyani Expressway runs through Chak Kanthalia.

WBTC Bus
 AC10 Nilganj - Howrah Station

Train
Barrackpore railway station and Titagarh railway station on the Sealdah-Ranaghat line are located nearby.

Education
P.N. Das College at Palta is located nearby.

Healthcare
Block Primary Health Centre at Bandipur is located nearby.

References

Cities and towns in North 24 Parganas district